Beak Woon-hak (born 1962) is a South Korean film director and screenwriter. Beak wrote and directed the thrillers Tube (2003) and The Chronicles of Evil (2015).

Career 
Beak was a TV producer and an ad producer, being involved in 50 commercials from 1993 to 1996. In 1996, he was an assistant director on Channel 69 (1996) and three years later, he was involved in the scriptwriting and production of Kang Je-gyu's blockbuster Shiri (1999). His short Waist Bottle won the Grand Prize at the Shin-young Youth Film Festival in 2003.

He made his directorial feature debut with the subway-set thriller Tube (2003).

His second feature The Chronicles of Evil (2015) starring Son Hyun-joo, also a thriller, was a hit with more than 2.1 million admissions.

Filmography 
Channel 69 (1996) - assistant director
Shiri (1999) - assistant director, script editor
Waist Bottle (short film, 2003)
Tube (2003) - director, screenwriter
The Chronicles of Evil (2015) - director, screenwriter

References

External links 
 
 
 
 

1962 births
Living people
South Korean film directors
South Korean screenwriters
Chung-Ang University alumni
Place of birth missing (living people)